Skandinaven  was a Norwegian language newspaper published in Chicago, Illinois  from 1866 until 1941.

Background
Skandinaven was established by three Norwegian immigrants; John Anderson, Knud Langeland (1813–88), and Iver Lawson (1822–72). John Anderson administered the business side of the newspaper. Iver Lawson was the landlord who provided a location and facilities. Knud Langeland was the first editor of Skandinaven.

Knud Langeland was an immigrant from Samnanger, Hordaland County, Norway. He arrived in the United States in 1843 and settled in Racine County, Wisconsin. In the fall of 1849 Langeland and his brother-in-law, O. J. Hatlestad, bought the printing press of the weekly, Nordlyset, from Even Hansen Heg and James DeNoon Reymert. This pioneer Norwegian newspaper publication ceased for financial reasons in  October 1851. In the fall of 1859, Langeland was elected by Racine County voters to the Wisconsin State Assembly. Langeland occupied the editorial chair of Skandinaven until 1881.

Iver Lawson was an investor who came to prosperity buying and selling real estate in Chicago during the mid-19th century. He also entered city politics, becoming a member of the city council in 1864. After the death of Iver Lawson in 1872, his son Victor F. Lawson took over the administration of his father's estate, which included his interest in Skandinaven. Victor Lawson would become the owner and publisher of the Chicago Daily News, the most widely read publication in Chicago during the late 19th century.

John Anderson, who was brought by his parents  from Voss, in Hordaland County, Norway to Chicago in 1845, had worked initially for the Chicago Tribune. Anderson decided in 1866 to leave the Chicago Tribune to start his own Norwegian-language newspaper. Anderson purchased the subscription lists of Norske-Amerikanerne, a failing Norwegian language newspaper. Langeland and Lawson briefly established a rival paper, Amerika. Skandinaven merged with Amerika  in 1873 to form Skandinaven og Amerika.

Operations
Starting the 1870s Skandinaven published a magazine that contained articles of interest, stories, and poetry. It carried works by Norwegian-American  writers including Hjalmar Hjorth Boyesen and Rasmus B. Anderson. Skandinaven became one of the most influential and successful newspapers in the Scandinavian immigrant community. Through the success of the paper, Anderson was able to build a publishing business that became the largest venture of its kind. In 1890 the firm was incorporated as the John Anderson Publishing Company.

From 1892 to 1911, Nicolai A. Grevstad was editor of Skandinaven. After 1900, the company began to suffer attrition. The gradual assimilation of Norwegian immigrants into the American population resulted in a dwindling reader base. Anundsen Publishing Company of Decorah, Iowa bought Skandinaven'''s subscriptions, with the intent of merging the subscription base with that of its own Norwegian language newspaper, the Decorah Posten. The last issue of Skandinaven was published on October 31, 1941.

When Skandinaven suspended publication, Reidar Rye Haugan established the Chicago based, Norwegian language newspaper Viking on which he served as both editor and publisher. In 1958, Chicago journalist Bertram Jensenius (1898-1976) took over Viking, renamed it Vinland and published it until his death in 1976.

References

Additional sourcesStory of Chicago in Connection with the Printing Business (Regan Printing House. Chicago, Illinois. 1912)
Larson, Laurence M. Skandinaven, Professor Anderson, and the Yankee School  (The Changing West and Other Essays, 116-146. Northfield, MN: 1937)
Øverland, Orm, The Western Home - A Literary History of Norwegian America'' (Norwegian-American Historical Association. 1996)

External links
Skandinaven Headquarters
Illinois Newspaper Project. University of Illinois, Urbana-Champaign

Newspapers established in 1866
Publications disestablished in 1941
Defunct newspapers published in Chicago
Norwegian migration to North America
Norwegian-American culture in Chicago
Norwegian-language newspapers published in the United States
1866 establishments in Illinois